The Huadian Formation is a palaeontological geological formation located in Jilin Province, northern China.

It dates to the Eocene period.

See also 
 List of fossil sites

References

Further reading 
  (1993); Wildlife of Gondwana. Reed. 

Geologic formations of China
Paleogene System of Asia
Eocene Series
Paleogene China
Paleontology in China
Geography of Jilin